Am Fraoch Eilean is an uninhabited island in the Sound of Jura, in the council area of Argyll and Bute, Scotland. Brosdale Island is located to the east. The name is Scottish Gaelic and means "the heather isle" and was formerly called "Ellan Charne". The ruins of Claig Castle are on Am Fraoch Eilean.

References

External links
 

Uninhabited islands of Argyll and Bute